Bloodhymns is Necrophobic's fourth full-length studio album.

Track listing

References 

2002 albums
Necrophobic albums